Robert Antoni Wolak (born September 19, 1955) is a Polish mathematician, habilitated doctor of mathematical sciences. He specializes in differential geometry, foliation theory and differential topology. Associate professor of the Department of Geometry of the Institute of Mathematics, Faculty of Mathematics and Computer Science of the Jagiellonian University.

References

1955 births
Living people
Polish mathematicians